Hydropsychinae is a subfamily level taxon consisting of net-spinning caddisflies.

Trichoptera subfamilies
Taxa named by John Curtis